The 2004 Berlin Thunder season was the sixth season for the franchise in the NFL Europe League (NFLEL). The team was led by head coach Rick Lantz in his first year, and played its home games at Olympic Stadium in Berlin, Germany. They finished the regular season in first place with a record of nine wins and one loss. In World Bowl XII, Berlin defeated the Frankfurt Galaxy 30–24. The victory marked the franchise's third World Bowl championship.

Offseason

Free agent draft

Personnel

Staff

Roster

Schedule

Standings

Game summaries

Week 1: vs Scottish Claymores

Week 2: at Amsterdam Admirals

Week 3: vs Cologne Centurions

Week 4: at Rhein Fire

Week 5: vs Amsterdam Admirals

Week 6: at Cologne Centurions

Week 7: vs Rhein Fire

Week 8: at Frankfurt Galaxy

Week 9: at Scottish Claymores

Week 10: vs Frankfurt Galaxy

World Bowl XII

Notes

References

Berlin
Berlin Thunder seasons